Salvia humboldtiana is a species of flowering plant in the family Lamiaceae that is endemic to Ecuador.
Its natural habitat is subtropical or tropical dry valley shrubland.

Notes

humboldtiana
Flora of Ecuador
Near threatened plants
Taxonomy articles created by Polbot